Winter Journey (translit. Zimniy put') is a 2013 Russian drama film about a young classical singer who falls in love with a street thug. The film takes its title from a Schubert song cycle, Winterreise, that the hero, Erik, a music student, is practising for a competition.

Plot
Music student and gifted singer, Erik, is preparing to sing Schubert's Winterreise for a competition. As his teacher slams him for his poor performance, Erik's life is changed irrevocably by a chance meeting with Lyokha, a coarse and aggressive petty criminal.

Cast
 Aleksey Frandetti as Erik
 Yevgeny Tkachuk as Lyokha
 Sergey Taramaev as Slava
 Egor Koreshkov as Borya
 Vladimir Mishukov as Pasha

Reception
The Dutch film director Jos Stelling described the film as "a genuine film... [which] went straight to my heart. The theme of the alleged homosexuality hardly played a role for me... To me this film sometimes approached the status of a masterpiece for its cinematographic values".

Awards

References

External links

2013 films
2013 drama films
Russian LGBT-related films
2013 LGBT-related films
2010s Russian-language films
Russian drama films
LGBT-related drama films